Luis Álvarez or Luis Alvarez may refer to:

In arts and entertainment

Writers 
 Ángel Luis Arambilet Álvarez (born 1957), Dominican writer, artist, filmmaker, and engineer; professionally known as Arambilet
 Carlos Luis Álvarez (es) (1928–2006), better known by his pseudonym Candido, was a Spanish writer and journalist
 Luis Álvarez Piñer (es) (1910–1999), Spanish poet and essayist
 Luis Álvarez Hernandez (es) (born 1978), Spanish journalist and photographer
 José Luis Álvarez Enparantza (1929–2012), better known by his pseudonym Txillardegi, Basque linguist, politician, and writer

Fictional characters 
 José Luis Álvarez, character played by Puerto Rican actor Luis Roberto Guzmán in the Mexican TV sitcom Lo que la vida me robó

Fine arts 
 José Luis Álvarez (1917–2012), Guatemalan painter
 Luis Álvarez Catalá (1836–1901), Spanish painter
 Luis Álvarez Urquieta (es) (born 1877), Chilean art historian and collector

Performing arts 
 Luis Álvarez (es), vocalist and guitarist with the Mexican urban rock band, El Haragán y Compañía
 Luis Álvarez Torres (es) (1913–1995), leading Peruvian actor

Government and public service 
 José Luis Álvarez y Álvarez (es) (born 1930), Spanish politician, notary (lawyer) and former mayor of Madrid
 José Luis Álvarez Blanco (gl) (born 1949), member of the People's Party of Galicia and mayor of Pantón, Spain
 José Luis Álvarez Martínez (born 1968), Mexican politician
 Luis Alberto Monge Álvarez (1925–2016), President of Costa Rica from 1982 to 1986
 Luis Héctor Álvarez (1919–2016), Mexican politician and industrialist
 Luis Echeverría Álvarez (born 1922), president of Mexico from 1970 to 1976

Military 
 Luis Álvarez (Argentine military) (es), Argentine military officer from the Argentine Civil War of the 19th century 
 Luis Alvarez (Dominican hero) (es), Dominican hero of War of Independence in the Battle of Azua

Natural science and medicine  
 Luis Walter Alvarez (1911–1988), physicist and Nobel Prize winner
 Luis Fernández Álvarez (1853–1937), physician and grandfather of Luis Walter Alvarez
 Luis Álvarez-Gaumé (b. 1955), Spanish theoretical physicist specializing in string theory and quantum gravity

In sports 
 José Luis Álvarez (born 1969), Spanish fencer
 José Luis Álvarez (es), Spanish taekwondo competitor (late 1980s — early 1990s)
 José Luis Álvarez "Rocky" (es) (born 1954), former Spanish boxer
 Jesús Luis Álvarez de Eulate Güergue (born 1970), commonly known as Koldo, former Andorran soccer player
 Luis Antonio Álvarez Murillo (born 1991), Mexican archer, also known as El Abuelo
 Luis Álvarez Gómez (es) (born 1959), former Spanish volleyball athlete
 Luis Álvarez de Cervera (born 1947), Spanish equestrian
 Luis Enrique Álvarez (es) (born 1990), Peruvian soccer player
 Luis Hernán Álvarez (1938–1991), Chilean soccer player
 Luis Roberto Álvarez (de) (born 1982), Spanish cyclist
 Luis Manuel Alvarez Saldaña (es)  (born 1955), former Spanish basketball player

Other uses 
 Luis Álvarez Renta (born 1950), Dominican economist
 José Luis Álvarez Santacristina (es) (born 1954), convicted former member of the ETA, an armed Basque nationalist and separatist organization

See also
 Louis Alvarez and Andrew Kolker, American documentary filmmakers
 Alvarez (disambiguation)
 Álvarez (surname)